The 2022 Thailand motorcycle Grand Prix (officially known as the OR Thailand Grand Prix) was the seventeenth round of the 2022 Grand Prix motorcycle racing season. It was held at the Buriram International Circuit in Buriram on 2 October 2022.

Background

Riders' entries 
In the MotoGP class, Joan Mir has not yet recovered from his ankle injury. The Suzuki Ecstar Team has decided to replace him in this Grand Prix with Danilo Petrucci, from the MotoAmerica Superbike Championship, and who until last year was racing in the premier class with the KTM of Team Tech3. Takaaki Nakagami skips this round to undergo surgery on his injured finger that he underwent during the Aragon round and is replaced by Tetsuta Nagashima in LCR Honda. In the Moto2 class, the now retired Gabriel Rodrigo continues to be replaced with Taiga Hada in the Pertamina Mandalika SAG Team. In the Moto3 class, in addition to Nicola Carraro who continues to substitute the injured Matteo Bertelle in the QJmotor Avintia Racing Team, there is a new replacement in the Rivacold Snipers Team against the convalescent Alberto Surra: it is Vicente Pérez, who had not raced in this category since the 2019 Catalan Grand Prix.

MotoGP Championship standings before the race 
Fabio Quartararo, taking advantage of Francesco Bagnaia's fall and Aleix Espargaró's arrival out of the points zone in the previous race, increases his advantage in the riders' classification, which he leads with 219 points, to +18 and +25 compared to the Italian respectively and some Spanish. Enea Bastianini is fourth with 170 points, followed by Jack Miller, winner at Motegi, with 159 points. In the constructors category, Ducati, already champion, dominates with 371 points; followed by Aprilia (226 points), Yamaha (221 points), KTM (181 points), Suzuki (134 points) and Honda (113 points). In the team standings, Ducati Lenovo Team is first with 360 points, with a 53-point advantage over Aprilia Racing; followed by Prima Pramac Racing (258 points) and Red Bull KTM Factory Racing (254 points) which overtake Monster Energy Yamaha MotoGP (247 points).

Moto2 Championship standings before the race 
The victory in the home Grand Prix by Ai Ogura ahead of Augusto Fernández allows the Japanese to reduce the gap to two points from the top of the riders' standings (234 points for Fernández, 232 for Ogura). Arón Canet and Celestino Vietti lose ground, both fallen in Motegi: now they are 57 and 72 points behind the summit. Tony Arbolino is fifth with 138 points. The constructors' classification states: Kalex (champion) 395 points, Boscoscuro 137 points, MV Agusta 5 points. In the team standings, Red Bull KTM Ajo leads with 366 points, with a 14-point lead over Idemitsu Honda Team. Flexbox HP40 is third at 260, Shimoko GasGas Aspar Team and Elf Marc VDS Racing Team are fourth and fifth respectively at 194 and 189 points.

Moto3 Championship standings before the race 
The victory in the Japanese Grand Prix allowed Izan Guevara, now at 254 points, to increase the lead in the riders' classification over his rivals: Sergio García and Dennis Foggia are now respectively 45 and 63 points behind the top. Ayumu Sasaki is fourth with 174 points, followed by Jaume Masià with 155 points. In the constructors' classification, Gas Gas leads with 312 points, followed by Honda (275 points), KTM (257 points), Husqvarna (210 points), CFMoto (115 points). In the team classification, AutoSolar GasGas Aspar Team is one step away from the title: it is first at 463 points, +144 on Leopard Racing. Red Bull KTM Ajo is third with 238 points, with just a two-point lead over Sterilgarda Husqvarna Max, while Red Bull KTM Tech3 is fifth with 194 points.

Qualifying

MotoGP

Moto2

Moto3

Race

MotoGP

Moto2
The race was originally scheduled to be run for 24 laps, but was initially shortened to 16 laps amid bad weather conditions. After heavier rainfall, race direction red-flagged the race after 8 full laps and decided not to restart the race. As a consequence, half points were awarded after failing to complete 2/3 of the race distance.

Moto3

Championship standings after the race
Below are the standings for the top five riders, constructors, and teams after the round.

MotoGP

Riders' Championship standings

Constructors' Championship standings

Teams' Championship standings

Moto2

Riders' Championship standings

Constructors' Championship standings

Teams' Championship standings

Moto3

Riders' Championship standings

Constructors' Championship standings

Teams' Championship standings

External links

Notes

References

2022 MotoGP race reports
MotoGP
2022
September 2022 sports events in Thailand
October 2022 sports events in Thailand